John Joseph Burke Sr. (March 28, 1888 – February 2, 1943) was an American professional golfer.

Professional career 
He finished in a tie for second place in the 1913 Canadian Open and also in the 1920 U.S. Open. Burke is credited with one PGA Tour win, one second-place, and three third-place showings in PGA Tour events, with 14 top-10s and 19 top-25s.

He won the Minnesota State Open four times.

Personal life 
He was the father of Jack Burke Jr.

Professional wins (6)
Note: This list may be incomplete.

1919 Minnesota State Open
1920 Minnesota State Open
1921 Minnesota State Open
1923 Minnesota State Open
1936 Texas PGA Championship
1941 Senior PGA Championship

Results in major championships

Note: Burke never played in the Masters Tournament or The Open Championship.

NYF = Tournament not yet founded
NT = No tournament
CUT = missed the halfway cut
WD = Withdrew
R64, R32, R16, QF, SF = Round in which player lost in PGA Championship match play
"T" indicates a tie for a place

References

External links
Texas Golf Hall of Fame – Jack Burke Sr.

American male golfers
Golfers from Philadelphia
1888 births
1943 deaths